The Pakistan national field hockey team represents Pakistan in international field hockey.  Having played its first match in 1948, it is administered by the Pakistan Hockey Federation (PHF), the governing body for hockey in Pakistan. It has been a member of the International Hockey Federation (FIH) since 1948 and was founding member of the Asian Hockey Federation (ASHF), which was formed in 1958.
Pakistan is one of the most successful national field hockey teams in the world with a record four Hockey World Cup wins (in 1971, 1978, 1982, and 1994).

Pakistan has the best overall performance in World Cup history in both proportional and absolute terms with 53 victories in 84 matches played, seven time draws, six appearances in the finals, and only 24 losses. Pakistan national team has played in all FIH World Cup editions with the only absence coming in 2014. The Green Shirts are also most successful national team in the Asian Games, with eight gold medals: 1958, 1962, 1970, 1974, 1978, 1982, 1990, and 2010, the highest number of times a country has come first, and the only Asian team to have won the prestigious Champions Trophy, with three championships: 1978, 1980 and 1994. Pakistan has won a total of 29 official international titles to professional and grassroots level selections, with three gold medals in the Olympic Games field hockey tournaments: in Rome 1960, Mexico City 1968, and Los Angeles 1984.

Field hockey is the national sport of the country. The Pakistan national team has been ranked as the #1 team in the world in both 2000 and 2001 by the FIH. Former captain Sohail Abbas holds the unconfirmed world record for the most international goals scored by a player in the history of international field hockey. Waseem Ahmad is the most-capped player for the team, having played 410 times between 1996 and 2013.

Pakistan is known for having fierce rivalry with India, having a record of playing each other in South Asian Games and Asian Games finals. They have competed against one another in twenty major tournaments finals so far, out of which Pakistan has won thirteen titles in total. Pakistan have a record of winning the first three championships of Hockey Asia Cup in 1982, 1985 and 1989 against India in row. Apart from that, Pakistan has notable competitive rivalries with Netherlands and Australia.

Pakistan's home ground is National Hockey Stadium in Lahore. The current team head coach is Siegfried Aikman and the team manager is Syed Sameer Hussain.

History

Early history (1948–1955)

Originally, the game had been brought by British servicemen to British India, and like cricket it soon became a popular sport with the local population. Following the independence of Pakistan in 1947, soon after the Pakistan Hockey Federation came into being in 1948. Prior to the partition of India, players playing for Pakistan competed for the Indian side. The Federation soon established and organized the Provincial Hockey/Sports Associations of West Punjab, East Bengal, Sindh, Balochistan, Khyber-Pakhtunkhwa, Bahawalpur & Services Sports Board. Despite the limited resources available on 2 August 1948, Pakistan national team, led by Ali Iqtidar Shah Dara, officially went on to play their first international game against Belgium winning the game 2–1 at the 1948 London Olympics. Pakistan remained unbeaten defeating the Netherlands, Denmark and France during the group stage round and ended up placing fourth. During the group stages Pakistan defeat of Netherlands by 6–1 was the highlight for the team. Following the Olympics Pakistan went on a tour of Europe where the played Belgium, Netherlands and Italy and remained undefeated during the tour.

The next international outing of the team came after a gap of two years when Pakistan participated in an invitational competition in Spain in 1950. Pakistan were declared joined winners with Netherlands after the final ended in a draw and organizers decided to end the game rather than going for a deciding period of play, this was Pakistan's first international tournament victory. Again there was a gap of two years before Pakistan again appeared in an international event and this time it was the 1952 Olympics in Helsinki. Pakistan won the first knock-out game against France 6–0 but lost to Netherlands and Great Britain to again finish fourth at the event. Over the four years Pakistan made tours to European teams and also hosted them in their own country and in Asia Pakistan particularly made regular tours to Malaysia and Singapore with whom they played quite a few times.

Rise in Olympics and Asian honors  (1956–1970)

Pakistan won their first Olympic medal in 1956 at Melbourne when they reached the final but lost to India 1–0 to earn a silver medal, first podium finish this was also Pakistan's first medal at the Olympics. Field hockey was included in the Asian Games for the first time in 1958 at Tokyo. Pakistan were drawn against Japan, South Korea, Malaysia and archrivals India. They beat Japan 5–0 in their first match, then followed two consecutive victories over South Korea (8–0) and Malaysia (6–0). In the last match Pakistan drew 0–0 with India finishing top of the table in the round-robin format and clinched its first gold medal in an international competition.

In 1960 Rome Olympics where Pakistan played against in a group with Australia, Poland and Japan, winning all the matches. Pakistan then played the quarter-final round with Germany, winning the match 2–1 and advanced to the semi-final round where they defeated Spain. Pakistan eventually won the gold medal, defeating India 1–0 with a goal by Naseer Bunda in the final round held at the Olympic Velodrome and ended India's run of six successive gold medals at the Summer Olympic Games.

In the 1962 Asian Games, Pakistan earned its second gold medal with Chaudhry Ghulam Rasool as the captain leading the team to another successive award. However, during the 1964 Tokyo Olympics the national team ended up as runners-up for the second time after losing 1–0 to India in the final as well as finishing runners-up in the 1966 Asian Games held in Bangkok, Thailand.
Pakistan won its second Olympic Games gold medal in Mexico at the 1968 Summer Olympics. It fielded what has since then often been considered the best hockey squad ever led by captain Tariq Aziz with Saeed Anwar, Khalid Mahmood, Gulraiz Akhtar and Tariq Niazi. Even though Rasool had retired, this team was still a force to be reckoned with. They won all six of their games—against Kenya, Great Britain, Malaysia, Australia, France and the Netherlands during group play, and against West Germany in the knockout round. Pakistan made the final for the fourth straight Olympics, and won the gold medal, as they had in 1960, this time by defeating Australia, 2–1 with goals from Muhammad Asad Malik and Abdul Rashid. Rashid was the top scorer for Pakistan with seven goals; Tanvir Dar finished with six goals.

The Golden Era (1970–1984)
In the group stage of the 1970 Asian Games, Pakistan was competing with tournament hosts Thailand and contenders Japan for top spot and a place in the finals. In their first match of the group, Pakistan scored thrice against Japan to clinch their first win, followed by defeating Hong Kong 10–0 to go to the top of the group. The team then draw 0–0 with Thailand and progressed to the knock-out round, where they won 5–0 over Malaysia. In the final, Pakistan faced India, winning 1–0 and sealing their third Asian Games gold medal.

In 1971, the first-ever Hockey World Cup was to be hosted by Pakistan. However, political issues would prevent that first competition from being played in Pakistan. The FIH had inadvertently scheduled the first World Cup to be played in Pakistan during the Bangladesh Liberation War. Furthermore, Pakistan and India had been at war with each other only six years earlier. When Pakistan invited India to compete in the tournament, a crisis arose. Pakistanis, led by cricketer Abdul Hafeez Kardar, protested against India's participation in the Hockey World Cup. Given the intense political climate between Pakistan and India, the FIH decided to move the tournament elsewhere. In March 1971, coincidentally in the same month Bangladesh declared independence from Pakistan, the FIH decided to move the first Hockey World Cup to the Real Club de Polo grounds in Barcelona, Spain, which was considered a neutral and peaceful European site. On 27 March 1971, in Brussels, the trophy was formally handed to FIH President Rene Frank by H.E Masood, the Pakistani Ambassador to Belgium. A total number of 10 teams qualified for the event and were broken up into two groups.

The Pakistani team was drawn in a group with hosts Spain, Australia, Japan and the Netherlands. The group was topped by Spain and Pakistan respectively, and both the teams advanced into the semi-finals. In the first semi-final of the tournament Pakistan ousted India 2–1 in a tense and closely contested game and in the second semi-final Spain played safe and defeated a spirited Kenya 1–0 to enter the finals against Pakistan. In the final Pakistan scored early but then strengthened its defense to hold out a 1–0 victory and win the first hockey World Cup, retaining its number one position in the world hockey rankings, closely followed by India and the Netherlands. Tanvir Dar finished as the top goal scorer at the tournament with eight goals.
The 1972 Munich Olympics, Pakistan lost the final to hosts West Germany losing the game 1–0 with a goal by Michael Krause and finished at fourth place, the following year, in the 1973 Hockey World Cup. The national team made a comeback in the international competition, by winning and retaining their title at the 1974 Asian Games but lost to their rivals India in the finals of the third hockey World Cup in 1975. 1976 Montreal Olympics saw the team secure their first bronze medal in the competition.

The year 1978 saw Pakistan national team win three major international tournaments: the third Hockey World Cup held at Buenos Aires, Argentina along with 1978 Asian Games and the first Champions Trophy. This was the first time a national team won three major titles in the history of international field hockey. In 1980, Pakistan Olympic Association, along with 65 countries, boycotted the 1980 Moscow Olympics because of the Soviet invasion of Afghanistan. This resulted in Pakistan hockey team not participating at the field hockey competition  at the tournament. Pakistan hosted the 1980 and 1981 Champions Trophy tournaments, winning the title against West Germany in the final round in 1980 and finishing at fourth position a year later, held at the Hockey Club of Pakistan, Karachi. In the 1980s Pakistan won every international tournament it participated in including the 1982 World Cup in Mumbai and the 1984 Olympics in Los Angeles where Pakistan won the gold medal defeating West Germany in the final. Pakistan also won the Asian Games and Asia Cup consecutively in this period.

Surface change crisis and resurgence (1986–1996)
Although hockey was being played at synthetic surfaces from the 1970s but it was only until the 1986 World Cup in London the FIH completely moved on from grass pitches to AstroTurf, synthetic turf made from plastic fibers to give a grass like look. The change of surface made the game much more fasted paced and to align the game with the new conditions the governing body vastly changed the rules of the game which focused more on strength and pace rather than stick work and technique which was the hallmark of Asian style of hockey. This negatively effected Pakistan since they couldn't replace all of the grass pitches with more expensive synthetic surfaces compared to more affluent European nations. This resulted in Pakistan performing very poorly at the World Cup in London where they won just one pool game and finished second last at 11th place. Pakistan however managed to cope up with the new changes in the game in the following years and started to regain some of its past dominance. Pakistan first finished runner-up at the 1990 World Cup at home in Lahore after losing the final to Netherlands and won a bronze medal at the 1992 Olympics in Barcelona. The most glorious highlight of the decade came in 1994 when Pakistan first won the 1994 Champions Trophy at home ground, their first title in the competition after 14 years and later in the year Pakistan won the Hockey World Cup in Sydney after winning a penalty shootout against Netherlands.

Post-Atlanta Olympics (1998–2006)
 
After Atlanta 1996 the first major competition was the 1998 Hockey World Cup in Utrecht Pakistan finished 5th at the tournament. The following year Pakistan won the Sultan Azlan Shah Cup for the first time in 1999. Pakistan finished fourth at the 2000 Olympics in Sydney after losing the bronze medal match to Australia, this was the last time Pakistan played for a medal at the Olympics. Pakistan finished 5th at 2002 World Cup and Kuala Lumpur and won bronze medal at the Champions Trophy the same year. At the 2002 Asian Games Pakistan finished fourth, the first time the team didn't won a medal at the competition. In 2003 Pakistan lost the Hockey Asia Cup final to India and in 2004 Pakistan had a busy schedule where they played in many tournaments in lead up to the Olympics but Pakistan finished 5th at the 2004 Athens Olympics later in December Pakistan finished third at the 2004 Champions Trophy in Lahore, the third consecutive bronze medal. In 2005 Pakistan had a highlight when they defeated Olympic champion Australia to win the 2005 Hockey RaboTrophy in Netherlands. Pakistan finished 6th the 2006 World Cup and failed even to progress from the pool stages of the 2007 Asia Cup.

Beijing Olympics and competitive decline (2008–2012)
The 2008 Beijing Olympics proved to be the worst performance of the team at the event where they finished 8th. The year 2010 started with another record worst performance at the 2010 World Cup in New Delhi where the team finished last at 12th place but later in the same year Pakistan had a major success by winning the gold medal at the 2010 Asian Games in China. In 2011 Pakistan played in many minor tournaments in lead up to the 2012 Olympics where they finished 7th. Later in the year 2012 Pakistan won bronze medal at the 2012 Champions Trophy in Melbourne after upsetting tournaments favorites like Germany. The Pakistani national team most successful tournament, in this period, was the Asian Hockey Champions Trophy winning the trophy first in 2012 against India and finishing as runners-up in the first edition of Asian Hockey Champions Trophy in 2011. During this period despite not any major team honor won the Pakistan team had world renowned individual players in world hockey in the likes of Sohail Abbas who remained top scorer at the 2002 World Cup and 2004 Olympics, he later broke the record of highest goalscorer in international hockey with a total of 348 goals and Rehan Butt who was twice voted as the Best Asian Player by Asian Hockey Federation, Shakeel Abbasi, Salman Akbar and Muhammad Saqlain.

World Cup and Olympic absentee (2013–2020)
Pakistan, after having failed to get a direct entrance for the 2014 World Cup, were handed a last chance to qualify for the event by winning the 2013 Asia Cup, but they finished third and failed to qualify for the World Cup for the first time in their history. Pakistan failed to qualify for the Olympics for the first time at Rio 2016 after failing a qualification berth at the 2014–15 FIH Hockey World League. From 2016 to 2017, Pakistan performed poorly in different competitions even featuring a record 9–1 defeat against Australia in 2017. In 2018, Roelant Oltmans of Netherlands was brought in as coach and the team showed some improvement, but still performed poorly at the 2018 World Cup, failing to win a single match. Pakistan again failed to qualify for the 2020 Olympics in Tokyo, losing the Olympic Qualifiers against Netherlands over a two-legged tie in 2019.

Present era (2021–present)
PHF announced Pakistan's participation for the 2021 Asian Champions Trophy, the team's first appearance in an international competition after a gap of two years. A 20-man squad was announced with Siegfried Aikman as head coach prior to the tournament.Pakistan could not qualify for the 2023 World Cup currently underway, despite it being a 16-team event.

Logo and stadium
The motif of the Pakistan national field hockey team has a star and crescent on a dark green field; with a vertical white stripe at the hoist, usually in green, white color, as represented in the flag of Pakistan.

Pakistan played at a number of different venues across the country, though by 1978, this had largely settled down to having National Hockey Stadium (also known as Gaddafi Hockey Stadium, named after former Libyan leader Muammar Gaddafi) in Lahore as the primary venue, with Faisalabad Hockey Stadium and the Hockey Club of Pakistan used on occasions where the National Hockey Stadium was unavailable for home matches. The stadium is considered to be the biggest international field hockey stadium in the world, and holds a capacity of 45,000 spectators.

The Pakistan Hockey Federation (PHF) has its headquarters at the stadium. Pakistan has hosted many international matches and competitions such as the Hockey Asia Cup of 1982 and Champions Trophy tournament in 1978, 1980, 1981, 1983, 1984, 1986, 1988, 1992, 1994, 1998, and 2004 along with the 1990 Hockey World Cup, where Pakistan lost 3–1 to the Netherlands in the final.

Honors and recognition
Since its breakthrough in the 1948 Summer Olympics, Pakistan has won more than 20 official titles, which are detailed below:

 Summer Olympics:
 Gold medal: 1960 Rome, 1968 Mexico City, 1984 Los Angeles
 Silver medal: 1956 Melbourne, 1964 Tokyo, 1972 Munich
 Bronze medal: 1976 Montreal, 1992 Barcelona
 World Cup:
 Gold medal: 1971, 1978, 1982, 1994
 Silver medal: 1975, 1990
 Champions Trophy:
 Gold medal: 1978, 1980, 1994
 Silver medal: 1983, 1984, 1988, 1991, 1996, 1998, 2014
 Bronze medal: 1986, 1992, 1995, 2002, 2003, 2004, 2012,
 Sultan Azlan Shah Cup:
 Gold medal: 1998, 2000, 2003
 Silver medal: 1983, 1987, 1991, 1994, 2004, 2011
 Bronze medal: 1985, 2005, 2022
 Asian Champions Trophy:
Gold medal: 2012, 2013, 2018
 Silver medal: 2011, 2016
 Asia Cup:
 Gold medal: 1982, 1985, 1989
 Silver medal: 1999, 2003, 2009
 Bronze medal: 1994, 2013, 2017
 Asian Games:
 Gold medal: 1958, 1962, 1970, 1974, 1978, 1982, 1990, 2010
 Silver medal: 1966, 1986, 2014
 Bronze medal: 1994, 1998, 2006
 Commonwealth Games:
 Silver medal: 2006
 Bronze medal: 2002
 South Asian Games:
 Gold medal: 2006, 2010, 2016
 Silver medal: 1995
 Afro-Asian Games:
 Silver medal: 2003
 Hockey Champions Challenge:
 Silver medal: 2009

Competitive record

Team performance
TBD (to be determined), DNQ (did not qualify), DNP (did not participate)

Records

As of 27 October 2019

Players in bold text are still active with Pakistan

Top goal scorers

Most-capped players

Players

Officials

Current players
Squad as of 22 Jul 2022 for 2022 Commonwealth Games, Birmingham.

Results and fixtures

2021
Asian Hockey Champions Trophy

2022
2022 Hockey Asia Cup2022 Commonwealth Games

Head-to-head record

Record last updated as of the following matches:

Pakistan vs Bangladesh at Jakarta, 2022 Hockey Asia Cup, 1 June 2022

See also
Pakistan Hockey League
India–Pakistan field hockey rivalry

References

External links

FIH profile

National team
Asian men's national field hockey teams
Field hockey